Khristina Boyanova (born 11 February 1966) is a Bulgarian ice dancer. She competed in the ice dance event at the 1984 Winter Olympics.

References

1966 births
Living people
Bulgarian female ice dancers
Olympic figure skaters of Bulgaria
Figure skaters at the 1984 Winter Olympics
Figure skaters from Sofia